The 2019 NRL Finals Series determined the winner of the 2019 National Rugby League season. The series ran over four weeks in September and October 2019. It culminated with the 2019 NRL Grand Final at Sydney's ANZ Stadium on 6 October 2019, where the Sydney Roosters defeated the Canberra Raiders 14–8.

The top eight teams from the 2019 NRL Season qualified for the finals series, playing under the same format since 2012. The qualifying teams were Melbourne, Sydney, South Sydney, Canberra, Parramatta, Manly Warringah, Cronulla-Sutherland and Brisbane.

Qualification 

Melbourne qualified for their 9th consecutive finals series. Sydney qualified for their 3rd consecutive final series. South Sydney qualified for their 2nd consecutive finals series. Canberra qualified for their first finals series since 2016. Parramatta qualified for their first finals series since 2017. Manly Warringah qualified for their first finals series since 2017. Cronulla-Sutherland qualified for their 5th consecutive series. Brisbane qualified for their 6th consecutive series.

Venues 
Canberra's GIO Stadium hosted one match, Melbourne's AAMI Park hosted two matches and Sydney hosted the remaining six matches, between ANZ Stadium, Bankwest Stadium, Lottoland and the Sydney Cricket Ground.

Finals structure 

The system used for the 2019 NRL finals series was a final eight system. In this format, the top four teams in the eight receive a "double chance" when they play in week-one qualifying finals, such that if a top-four team lose in the first week it still remained in the finals, playing a semi-final the next week against the winner of an elimination final. The bottom four of the eight will play knock-out games – only the winners survive and move on to the next week. Home-ground advantage goes to the team with the higher ladder position in the first two weeks, to the qualifying final winners in the third week.

In the second week, the winners of the qualifying finals receive a bye to the third week. The losers of the qualifying final play the winners of the elimination finals in a semi-final. In the third week, the winners of the semi-finals from week two play the winners of the qualifying finals in the first week. The winners of those matches move on to the grand final at ANZ Stadium in Sydney.

Bracket

Qualifying and elimination finals

2nd Qualifying final: Sydney v South Sydney

1st Qualifying final: Melbourne v Canberra

2nd Elimination final: Manly-Warringah v Cronulla-Sutherland

1st Elimination final: Parramatta v Brisbane

Semi-finals

2nd Semi-final: South Sydney v Manly-Warringah

1st Semi-final: Melbourne v Parramatta

Preliminary finals

1st Preliminary final: Canberra v South Sydney

2nd Preliminary final: Sydney v Melbourne

Grand Final

References

2019 in rugby league
2019 NRL season